Jonathan Andersson (born September 7, 1993) is a Swedish professional ice hockey Defenseman, currently playing for Luleå HF in the Swedish Hockey League (SHL).

Playing career
Andersson played as a youth and made his Elitserien debut with AIK IF during the 2012–13 season.

After four seasons in the SHL with Örebro HK, Andersson left the club at the conclusion of his contract and agreed to a two-year deal with fellow Swedish club, Luleå HF, on 5 May 2021.

Career statistics

References

External links

1993 births
AIK IF players
Living people
Luleå HF players
IK Oskarshamn players
Swedish ice hockey centres
Örebro HK players